The Roman Catholic Diocese of Butare is an ecclesiastical territory or diocese of the Roman Catholic Church in Rwanda. It was erected on 11 September 1961 as the Diocese of Astrida by Pope John XXIII, and was later renamed as the Diocese of Butare on 12 November 1963 by Pope Paul VI. The diocese is a suffragan of the Archdiocese of Kigali.

Philippe Rukamba was appointed Bishop of Butare by Pope John Paul II on 2 January 1997.

A prominent priest of this diocese was Msgr Eulad Rudahunga, serving from 1953 to 2019, and made a Monsignor by Pope John Paul II.

Bishops

List of bishops of Butare
Jean-Baptiste Gahamanyi (1961–1997)
Philippe Rukamba (1997–present)

Auxiliary Bishop
Félicien Muvara (1988), did not take effect

References

External links
Catholic-Hierarchy 
GCatholic.org 

Butare
Christian organizations established in 1961
Butare
Roman Catholic dioceses and prelatures established in the 20th century
1961 establishments in Ruanda-Urundi